Euthalia phemius, the white-edged blue baron, is a species of butterfly of the family Nymphalidae. It is found in Sikkim, Assam, Burma, southern China, and Hong Kong.

Subspecies
The subspecies of Euthalia phemius found in India are-

 Euthalia phemius phemius Doubleday, 1848 – Sylhet White-edged Blue Baron

References

P
Butterflies of Asia
Insects of Myanmar
Butterflies described in 1848